Ptychomniales is an order of mosses in the subclass Bryidae.

References

External links 
 
 
 
 Ptychomniales at Tropicos

 
Moss orders